Govindghat is a town in Chamoli district, Uttarakhand, India, located at the confluence of the Alaknanda and Lakshman Ganga rivers. It is the roadhead on the way to Shree Badrinathji yatra - One of the important places of worship of Hindus and the starting point for trekking to Hemkund Sahib and Valley of Flowers. Hundreds of people, mostly Hindu pilgrims to Shree Badrinathji and Sikh pilgrims on way to the holy shrine of Shree Hemkund Sahibji and occasional tourists to the Valley of Flowers, arrive here every day.

The gurudwara, located on the right bank of the Alaknanda River, is the most important landmark in the area. It also provides accommodation to pilgrims. The local market has many hotels, guest houses and restaurants. The economy thrives on the traveling season, which begins at the end of May and lasts until the end of September.

See also
River Pushpawati
Ghangaria

References

External links
GMVN 

Tourism in Uttarakhand
Geography of Uttarakhand
Cities and towns in Chamoli district